The first season of the television series Hannah Montana was aired on Disney Channel from March 24, 2006, to March 30, 2007, and included 26 episodes. It introduces the five main characters of the series and Miley Stewart's situation of living a secret double life as a teen pop star. The season also introduces several significant recurring characters such as Roxy Roker, Jake Ryan, and Rico Suave.

The season's soundtrack was released on October 24, 2006, under the title Hannah Montana. The season itself was released on DVD as a four disc set on November 18, 2008, by Disney DVD. Certain individual episodes had been released earlier on other Hannah Montana DVDs.

Production
Hannah Montana debuted Friday, March 24, 2006, on Disney Channel with "Lilly, Do You Want to Know a Secret?" The first season completed its run on March 30, 2007, with "Bad Moose Rising". In the United Kingdom it first aired in the Summer period of 2006, then the first series aired on free-to-view channel FIVE showing all episodes, the second series then aired in 2009. The first season consists of 26 colored, full-screen, approx. 23-minute episodes (without ads) recorded using a multiple-camera setup. Production began on November 7, 2005, and ended in September 2006.

Casting

The show's five stars — Miley Cyrus, Emily Osment, Mitchel Musso, Jason Earles, and Billy Ray Cyrus — appear in all first-season episodes.

Recurring cast are Shanica Knowles as Amber Addison, Anna Maria Perez de Tagle as Ashley Dewitt, Greg Baker as Francis Corelli, Morgan York as Sarah, Cody Linley as Leslie "Jake" Ryan, Romi Dames as Traci Van Horn, Dolly Parton as Aunt Dolly, Vicki Lawrence as Mamaw Ruthie, Frances Callier as Roxy, and Moises Arias as Rico.

There were many guest stars including Corbin Bleu as Johnny Collins, Paul Vogt as Dontzig, Matt Winston as Fermine, Andre Kinney as Cooper, Ashley Tisdale as Maddie Fitzpatrick, and Lisa Arch as Liza the photographer.

Co-stars for this season are Derek Basco, Kyle Kaplan, Creagen Dow, Jack Taylor, Blake Berris, Frances Bay, Christian Serratos, Ryan Newman, Summer Bishil, Kunal Sharma, Cutter Garcia, Helen Duffy, Jeff Mallare, Betsy Kelso, Noah Cyrus, Aimee Teegarden, Gena DeVivo, Destiny Edmond, Jay Brian Winnick, Dollar Tan, Jason Thornton, Gary Pease, Marius Mazmanian, and Alec Leddand.

Episodes

This season consists of twenty-six episodes. 
The series premiere with "Lilly, Do You Want to Know a Secret?" had 5.4 million viewers breaking the highest-rated series premiere on a kids network in seven years and was the highest rated Disney Channel series premiere until Cory in the House. In the episode, Miley reveals to Lilly that she is Hannah Montana.
Season 1 included a special episode called "On the Road Again?" that was part of "That's So Suite Life of Hannah Montana". The episode had cross-overs with shows That's So Raven and The Suite Life of Zack & Cody.

References

General references

External links

 

 
2006 American television seasons
2007 American television seasons

da:Hannah Montana-afsnit
es:Anexo:Episodios de Hannah Montana
pl:Lista odcinków serialu Hannah Montana
tr:Hannah Montana Bölümleri Listesi (Sezon 1)